Lucía Martín González (born 15 January 1979, Lugo) is a Spanish environmental engineer and politician. She was elected to the Congress of Deputies. She is Councillor for Housing and Renovation for the City Council of Barcelona.

She was an organizer for Plataforma de Afectados por la Hipoteca. She was a candidate in the 2015 Spanish local elections.

In the 2015 Spanish general election, she was elected deputy for Barcelona in the En Comú Podem party.

References 

1979 births
Living people
Women members of the Congress of Deputies (Spain)
21st-century Spanish women politicians